In textile manufacturing, gassing is the process of passing newly spun yarn through a flame to remove the loose fibre ends.

References

See also 

 Singeing (textiles)

Textile arts